The 2019 British Speedway Championship was the 59th edition of the British Speedway Championship. Robert Lambert was the defending champion having won the title in 2018. The competition consisted of one semi-final and a final, with six riders qualifying from the semi-final, there were 10 riders seeded to the final. These riders were Robert Lambert, Rory Schlein, Chris Harris, Dan Bewley, Craig Cook, Richard Lawson, Edward Kennett, Scott Nicholls, Adam Ellis and Danny King. However, Lambert and Ellis missed out on the final due to injury, so Lambert was unable to defend his title. The championship was won by Charles Wright for the first time, King finished second, while Cook took third place.

Results

Semi-final 
  Redcar
 31 May 2019

The Final 
  National Speedway Stadium, Gorton
 29 July 2019

See also 
 British Speedway Championship

References 

British Speedway Championship
British
Speedway